John Hartmann Eriksen (20 November 1957 – 12 February 2002) was a Danish footballer who played as a striker. He scored 319 league goals over the course of 15 seasons. He played in four countries, namely his native Denmark, the Netherlands, France and Switzerland. Eriksen was a Danish international in the 1980s, appearing in the 1986 FIFA World Cup and UEFA Euro 1988.

Early life
Eriksen was born on 20 November 1957 in Assens. In 1964 he moved with his family from Assens to Svendborg, where he and his brother started playing football in Svendborg fB. Here he won the Funen boy Championship in 1968. He debuted for the club in June 1975, aged 17.

Club career
After two season with Svendborg, Eriksen switched to the largest club on Funen, OB, scoring 22 goals in each of his two seasons with the club. In January 1980, he moved to Roda in the Netherlands, never netting less than 16 goals in each of his four Eredivisie seasons.

In 1984–85, Eriksen joined FC Mulhouse in the French Ligue 2, finishing second in the goal scoring charts as the club narrowly missed on promotion, falling short in the playoffs. In the summer, he returned to the Netherlands and joined Feyenoord, again surpassing the 20-goal mark as the Rotterdam outfit ranked in third position.

Aged almost 29, Eriksen moved to Switzerland where he continued to display solid scoring form, for both Servette FC (having played alongside Karl-Heinz Rummenigge) and FC Luzern. With the former, he led the scorers list in his first two seasons, notably scoring 36 in 34 games in 1987–88 (second position overall, only two points behind champions Neuchâtel Xamax).

Eriksen ended his career at nearly 36 with his first club, hometown's Svendborg fB.

International career
Eriksen won 17 caps and scored six goals for Denmark, his debut coming in 1981. He was selected for the squad that competed in the 1986 FIFA World Cup, appearing as a substitute against West Germany (2–0 win, one goal) and Spain (1–5 round-of-16 loss).

Eriksen was also picked for UEFA Euro 1988 in West Germany, playing twice in an eventual group stage exit (two 0–2 losses), starting against Italy.

Death
After ending his career, Eriksen suffered Alzheimer's disease, and lived his last three years in a nursing home in Svendborg. After falling accidentally in his home, he died on 12 February 2002, at 44 years of age. He was buried in St. Nicolai Church in Svendborg on 20 February 2002.

References

External links
Stats at Voetbal International 
Roda JC official profile 
National team data 

1957 births
2002 deaths
Danish men's footballers
Association football forwards
SfB-Oure FA players
Danish Superliga players
Odense Boldklub players
Eredivisie players
Roda JC Kerkrade players
Feyenoord players
Ligue 2 players
FC Mulhouse players
Swiss Super League players
Servette FC players
FC Luzern players
Denmark international footballers
Denmark under-21 international footballers
Denmark youth international footballers
1986 FIFA World Cup players
UEFA Euro 1988 players
Danish expatriate men's footballers
Expatriate footballers in the Netherlands
Expatriate footballers in France
Expatriate footballers in Switzerland
Danish expatriate sportspeople in the Netherlands
Danish expatriate sportspeople in France
Danish expatriate sportspeople in Switzerland
People from Assens Municipality
Sportspeople from the Region of Southern Denmark